Norbert Feketics (born 13 June 1996) is a Romanian professional footballer who plays as a midfielder.

References

External links
 
 

1996 births
Living people
Sportspeople from Târgu Mureș
Romanian footballers
Association football midfielders
Liga I players
ASA 2013 Târgu Mureș players
Budapest Honvéd FC players